The Clemson Tigers football statistical leaders are individual statistical leaders of the Clemson Tigers football program in various categories, including passing, rushing, receiving, total offense, defensive stats, kicking, and scoring. Within those areas, the lists identify single-game, single-season, and career leaders. The Tigers represent Clemson University in the NCAA's Atlantic Coast Conference (ACC).

Although Clemson began competing in intercollegiate football in 1896, the school's official record book does not generally include statistics from before the 1940s, as records from before this time are often incomplete and inconsistent.

These lists are dominated by more recent players for several reasons:
 Since the 1940s, seasons have increased from 10 games to 11 and then 12 games in length.
 The NCAA didn't allow freshmen to play varsity football until 1972 (with the exception of the World War II years), allowing players to have four-year careers.
 Bowl games only began counting toward single-season and career statistics in 2002. The Tigers have played in 22 bowl games since this decision, including two in 2015, 2016, 2018, and 2019, giving many recent players extra games to accumulate statistics. Similarly, the Tigers have played in the ACC Championship Game seven times since 2009.
 The Tigers have topped the 5,000-yard mark 17 times in school history, with ten of those coming since 2010. The Tigers eclipsed 6,000 offensive yards for the first time in 2011 and have now done it nine times. The Tigers set an offensive record in 2019, with 7,931 yards, their fourth year eclipsing the 7,000-yard mark, overtaking 2018's 7,908 yards. In 2015 they gained 7,718 yards and nearly matched it with 7,555 yards in 2016. This means more recent players will tend to dominate offensive lists.

These lists are updated through the Tigers' game against Ohio State on January 1, 2021.

Passing

Passing yards

Passing touchdowns

Rushing

Rushing yards

Rushing touchdowns

Receiving

Receptions

Receiving yards

Receiving touchdowns

Total offense
Total offense is the sum of passing and rushing statistics. It does not include receiving or returns.

Total offense yards

Touchdowns responsible for
"Touchdowns responsible for" is the NCAA's official term for combined passing and rushing touchdowns.

Defense

Interceptions

Tackles

Sacks

Kicking

Field goals made

Field goal percentage

Scoring
Clemson does not list single-game scoring leaders in its football media guide. Its officially recognized single-game scoring record is 33 points, set by Maxcey Welch in a 1930 game against Newberry. This is one of the very few "old-time" records that the program acknowledges.

Points

Touchdowns
Unlike the "Total touchdowns" lists in the "Total offense" section, these lists count touchdowns scored. Accordingly, these lists include rushing, receiving, and return touchdowns, but not passing touchdowns.

As in the case of the single-game scoring record, Clemson does not publish an all-time list of top performances for single-game touchdowns. As in the case of single-game points, the school's officially recognized record in this category comes from the "pre-modern" era. The aforementioned Maxcey Welch scored 5 touchdowns (all rushing) as part of his record 33-point performance against Newberry in 1930; this equaled Stumpy Banks' performance of 5 rushing touchdowns in a 1917 game against Furman.

References

Clemson